Whayne Wilson Harris (born 7 September 1975 in Limón – died 18 May 2005 in Costa Rica) was a Costa Rican professional footballer.

Club career
Wilson started his career at second division Limonense and made his professional debut with Herediano on November 26, 1997, and scored his first league goal for Herediano against Goicoechea on March 4, 1998. He had his best season with Ramonense where he scored 20 goals to be the second leading scorer of the 2003-04 season. Wilson played for Cartaginés and then Brujas during the 2004-05 season. Overall, he scored 72 goals in 192 matches in the Primera División de Costa Rica.

His brother Kéndall is professional footballer.

International career
Wilson made 8 appearances for the senior Costa Rica national football team, his debut coming in the Copa América 2004 against Chile on 16 February 2005.  He appeared in all four matches and scored three goals as Costa Rica won the UNCAF Nations Cup 2005 tournament. Wilson also made two appearances during qualifying for the 2006 FIFA World Cup.

Wilson was a member of the Costa Rica national football team at the 2004 Summer Olympics in Athens.

Death
On May 14, 2005 Wilson's car collided with a truck on a highway along the Caribbean coast of Costa Rica. Wilson died four days later in the Calderón Guardia hospital in San José, Costa Rica. He left four young daughters and his partner Corina McKenzie. In 2011 another Costa Rican international, Dennis Marshall, died in a car accident on the same road.

Career statistics

International goals
Scores and results list. Costa Rica's goal tally first.

References

External links
 

1975 births
2005 deaths
People from Limón Province
Association football forwards
Costa Rican footballers
Costa Rica international footballers
2004 Copa América players
2005 UNCAF Nations Cup players
Olympic footballers of Costa Rica
Footballers at the 2004 Summer Olympics
Copa Centroamericana-winning players
C.S. Herediano footballers
C.S. Cartaginés players
Santos de Guápiles footballers
A.D. Ramonense players
Brujas FC players
Road incident deaths in Costa Rica